Gabriel Green (born May 2, 1993) is an American mixed martial artist who competes in the Welterweight division of the Ultimate Fighting Championship.

Background
Coming from an athletic family, Green played football while attending Warren High School and had a boxing bag in his backyard where his father taught him to box. He would eventually join a gym after his friend suggested they try together and after two months had his first amateur bout. He would win his next 6 amateur bouts before going pro because of lack of opponents on the amateur scene.

Green attended California State University, Long Beach, where he earned his bachelor's degree in business despite starting out in the pre-med program.

Mixed martial arts career

Early career
Having his debut in 2016, he compiled a 9–2 record before the UFC fighting mostly in California, winning the CXF 160 lb Championship in his last bout before his short notice bout in the UFC. He made 3 appearances in Bellator MMA, winning his first appearance at Bellator 160 against Alex Trinidad via second-round TKO, losing at Bellator 170 against fellow future UFC fighter Jalin Turner 36 seconds into the bout, and finally winning via second round rear-naked choke against Chris Padilla at Bellator 192.

Ultimate Fighting Championship
Green, replacing Kevin Holland, faced Daniel Rodriguez on May 30, 2020, at UFC Fight Night: Woodley vs. Burns. Green lost the fight via unanimous decision.

Green was scheduled to face Dwight Grant on October 23, 2021, at UFC Fight Night 196. However, Green was removed from the pairing on 23 September for undisclosed reasons and replaced by Francisco Trinaldo.

Green faced UFC newcomer Philip Rowe at UFC 258 on February 13, 2021. He won the bout via unanimous decision.

Green faced Yohan Lainesse on April 30, 2022, at UFC on ESPN: Font vs. Vera. Despite getting knocked down earlier, he won the fight via TKO in the second round.

Green faced Ian Garry on July 2, 2022 at UFC 276. He lost the bout via unanimous decision.

Green is next expected to face Jake Matthews at UFC Fight Night 224 on May 13, 2023.

Championships and accomplishments
 California Xtreme Fighting
CXF 160 lb Championship (One time; former)

Mixed martial arts record

|-
|Loss
|align=center|11–4
|Ian Garry
|Decision (unanimous)
|UFC 276
| 
|align=center|3
|align=center|5:00
|Las Vegas, Nevada, United States
|
|-
| Win
| align=center|11–3
| Yohan Lainesse
| TKO (punches)
| UFC on ESPN: Font vs. Vera
| 
| align=center|2
| align=center|4:02
| Las Vegas, Nevada, United States
| 
|-
| Win
| align=center| 10–3
| Philip Rowe
|Decision (unanimous)
|UFC 258
|
|align=center|3
|align=center|5:00
|Las Vegas, Nevada, United States
|
|-
| Loss
| align=center| 9–3
|Daniel Rodriguez
| Decision (unanimous)
|UFC on ESPN: Woodley vs. Burns
|
|align=center|3
|align=center|5:00
|Las Vegas, Nevada, United States
|
|-
| Win
| align=center|9–2
| Richard LeRoy
|KO (punches)
|CXF 14: Boiling Point
|
|align=center|2
|align=center|4:52
|Studio City, California, United States
|
|-
| Win
| align=center|8–2
| Javier Garcia
| Technical Submission (rear-naked choke)
|Combate 20: Combate Estrellas 1
|
| align=center|3
| align=center|1:03
|Los Angeles, California, United States
|
|-
| Win
| align=center|7–2
| Chris Padilla
| Technical Submission (rear-naked choke)
| Bellator 192
| 
| align=center | 1 
| align=center | 2:46	
| Inglewood, California, United States 
| 
|-
| Win
| align=center| 6–2
| Ivan Castillo
| Submission (rear-naked choke)
| Extreme Fighters MMA Events 1
| 
| align=center| 1
| align=center| 1:12
| Long Beach, California, United States
| 
|-
| Win
| align=center| 5–2
| Leon Shahbazyan
|TKO (punches)
|CXF 8: Cali Kings
|
|align=center|1
|align=center|3:23
|Burbank, California, United States
|
|-
| Win
| align=center| 4–2
|Matt Hagge
|Submission (rear-naked choke)
|CXF 7: Locked and Loaded
|
|align=center|1
|align=center|3:20
|Studio City, California, United States
|
|-
| Loss
| align=center|3–2
|Jalin Turner
| KO (punches) 
| Bellator 170
| 
| align=center | 1 
| align=center | 0:36 
| Inglewood, California, United States 
|
|-
| Loss
| align=center| 3–1
| Randon Abafo
|TKO (punches)
|War on the Valley Isle 5
|
|align=center|1
|align=center|3:26
|Wailuku, Hawaii, United States
|
|-
| Win
| align=center|3–0
| Alex Trinidad
|TKO (punches)
|Bellator 160
|
| align=center|2
| align=center|2:01
|Anaheim, California, United States
|
|-
| Win
| align=center|2–0
| Hakob Ter-Petrosyan
| Submission (rear-naked choke)
|Fight Club OC: Boxing and MMA Fight Series
|
| align=center|1
| align=center|4:13
|Costa Mesa, California, United States
|
|-
| Win
| align=center|1–0
| Andrew Lagdaan
| Submission (rear-naked choke)
|Fight Club OC 41
|
|align=center|2
|align=center|2:40
|Costa Mesa, California, United States
|

See also 
 List of current UFC fighters
 List of male mixed martial artists

References

External links 
  
 

1993 births
Living people
American male mixed martial artists
Welterweight mixed martial artists
Mixed martial artists utilizing boxing
Mixed martial artists utilizing Brazilian jiu-jitsu
Ultimate Fighting Championship male fighters
American male boxers
American practitioners of Brazilian jiu-jitsu
California State University, Long Beach alumni
People from San Pedro, Los Angeles
Mixed martial artists from California